Undi is a village in West Godavari district of the Indian state of Andhra Pradesh.

It is located about 39 kilometers from Eluru town.

Geography
It has an average elevation of 2 meters (9 feet).

Demographics
According to census-2011, Undi has

Number of households: 3,719
Total Population: 15,322
Male Population: 7,389
Female population: 7,711

References 

Villages in West Godavari district